The General Fono is the parliament of Tokelau. It has 20 members (15 before 2008), representing the 3 atolls. Elections are held every three years.

Tokelau is a de facto non-partisan democracy since both village and Fono elections are made without political parties.

Results of the 2023 election

See also
Council for the Ongoing Government of Tokelau

References

Tokelau
Politics of Tokelau
Political organisations based in Tokelau
Tokelau
Government of Tokelau